Bomarea longipes is a species of plant in the Alstroemeriaceae family. It is endemic to Peru and Ecuador.  Its natural habitat is subtropical or tropical moist montane forests. It is threatened by habitat loss.

References

Flora of Ecuador
Flora of Peru
longipes
Critically endangered plants
Plants described in 1882
Taxonomy articles created by Polbot
Taxa named by John Gilbert Baker